Greyhound racing in Australia is a sport and gambling activity. Australia is one of several countries with a greyhound racing industry. The industry laws are governed by the State Government but the keeping of greyhounds are governed by the Local Authority.

Regulation
Each Australian state and territory has a greyhound racing body that regulates the racing, training and animal welfare of greyhounds in that state or territory. Greyhound Racing New South Wales (GRNSW) and Greyhound Racing Victoria (GRV) are the two largest authorities, governing over 40 racetracks. The Queensland Greyhound Racing Authority (QGRA), the Western Australian Greyhound Racing Association (WAGRA), Tasracing, Greyhound Racing South Australia (GRSA) and the Northern Territory Racing Authority all contribute to running and monitoring of greyhound racing and animal welfare of greyhounds in Australia.

Australian Capital Territory
There is currently no racing in the ACT following a territory ban in 2018. The Canberra Greyhound Racing Club (CGRC) is still active using their Symonston track as a training facility but the club races at Goulburn in New South Wales.

Venues

New South Wales
In 1927 Frederick 'Judge' Swindell established the Greyhound Coursing Association and the first meeting was held using a 'tin hare' at Epping Racecourse (Harold Park) on 28 May 1927. From 1928 until 1931 betting was banned. Harold Park continued to be the only venue to have a licence until July 1938 when the government granted a second licence (consisting of 26 fixtures) for Wentworth Park. Although the licence was granted in July 1938 it was not until Saturday 28 October 1939 that the new track opened. The opening had been delayed due to the construction of the track taking longer than expected.

In 1939 the NSW Greyhound Breeders, Owners and Trainers Association was founded. In 1979, live hare coursing and other similar activities, including live baiting, was banned in NSW under the Prevention of Cruelty to Animals Act and in 1985 Wentworth Park became the racing headquarters of NSW. In 2009, the government formed a new legislation, known as the Greyhound Racing Act 2009 which made provisions in regards to the control and regulation of the industry and the Greyhound Racing NSW (GRNSW) then became responsible for the regulatory affairs of the sport in addition to the commercial aspects.

In February 2015, the industry came under severe scrutiny following the airing of the ABC program Four Corners. A series of media reports called the Australian greyhound racing live baiting scandal detailed the use of live bait animals in the training of racing greyhounds. In June 2016, Australian former High Court judge Michael McHugh conducted a Special Commission of Inquiry for the Australian state of New South Wales where key findings in the report included a high death rate with uncompetitive greyhounds being euthanised over a twelve year period and the under reporting of greyhound deaths and injuries. Despite self-regulatory efforts to address the issue of live baiting and other animal welfare issues, the investigation led to suspensions, inquiries, condemnation of the practice and the banning of greyhound racing in New South Wales and the Australian Capital Territory from 1 July 2017,  following the passage of legislation. However the ban was repealed by Mike Baird on 11 October 2016. The appointment of the NSW Greyhound Reform Panel made 122 recommendations to the NSW government, of which 121 were adopted. Victoria commissioned the Perna Report and Queensland the MacSporran report. As part of the NSW government recommendations, it created GWIC (Greyhound Welfare and Integrity Commission), which is a taxpayer funded, non-industry regulator of the greyhound racing industry. 

The NSW Greyhound Welfare Code of Practice came into effect on 1 January 2021, with 58 code practice standards (out of 124 in total) relating to retired greyhounds. The code is the benchmark for expected conduct and behaviour and has an Enforcement Protocol. In 2022, Lismore was forced to close following flooding and the inability to widen its track as per the code of practice.

Venues

There are 28 current venues in New South Wales  of which 18 are Totalisator Agency Board (TAB) operated. Active tracks are highlighted in blue.

+ TAB operated

Northern Territory
Greyhound racing in the Northern Territory (NT) is regulated by Licensing NT on behalf of the NT Racing Commission There is one active track in the NT.

Venues

Queensland
There are six current venues in Queensland.

Venues

South Australia
There are four active tracks in South Australia.

Venues

Tasmania
Tasracing, which was established in November 2008, is responsible for the strategic direction and funding, while the Office of Racing Integrity Tasmania (ORI) is responsible for probity and integrity. There are three active tracks in Tasmania.

Venues

Victoria
See Greyhound Racing Victoria.

Venues

Western Australia

In 1981, the Western Australian Greyhound Racing Association (WAGRA) was established under the Western Australian Greyhound Racing Association Act. Cannington Greyhounds was the first track in Western Australia, opening in 1974 and was consequently transferred to the WAGRA. This was later followed by the merger of the Mandurah Greyhound Racing Association. There are three active tracks in Western Australia.

Venues

Notable Australian greyhounds
 Brett Lee (whelped January 1999, raced 2000–2001)
 Chief Havoc (whelped September 1944, raced 1946–1948)
 Fanta Bale (whelped August 2014, raced 2016–2018)
 Fernando Bale (whelped December 2013, raced 2015)
 Zoom Top (whelped August 1966, raced 1967–1969)

Major races
The Melbourne Cup for greyhounds was previously the world's richest greyhound race, with a prize pool of 600,000 in 2015. NSW hosts the world's richest race, the Million Dollar Chase in October at Wentworth Park. In Sydney, the 2013 Golden Easter Egg had a first prize of  250,000.

 Million Dollar Chase (Wentworth Park) $1,000,000
 Melbourne Cup (Sandown Park) $435,000
 Australian Cup (The Meadows) $300,000
 Adelaide Cup (Angle Park) $300,000
 Golden Easter Egg (Wentworth Park) $250,000
 Perth Cup (Cannington) $150,000
 Garrards Gold Bullion (Albion Park) $150,000
 TAB Topgun 525 (The Meadows) $150,000
 Bold Trease Final (Sandown Park) $105,000
 Silver Chief (The Meadows) $100,000
 Temlee 525m (The Meadows) $100,000
 Fanta Bale – Super Stayers (The Meadows) $100,000
 Galaxy (Cannington) $100,000
 Maturity Classic (The Meadows) $100,000
 Sportsbet Dapto Group 1 Megastar (Dapto) $75,000

Adoption
Many adoption programs have been set up throughout Australia. There are industry programs and non-industry rescue groups (which are usually charities).  Greyhounds are available for adoption in most parts of Australia. Families that have adopted greyhounds soon discover that these dogs are naturally gentle, loving and, surprisingly, don't need a lot of exercise. The industry's Greyhound Adoption Program (GAP) operates in most states but does not re-home all ex-racing greyhounds. In 2018, 257 greyhounds (38%) failed the New South Wales rehoming test. However the validity of this report should be questioned based on the fact that in the United States the estimated adoption rate is over 95% and in the United Kingdom the 2018 Greyhound Commitment has pledged to home 100% of all ex-racers under the Greyhound Retirement Scheme.

Adoption has been hampered in states and territories which cling to old-fashioned beliefs about the need to muzzle pet greyhounds. Both the RSPCA and the Australian Veterinary Association recommend against muzzles for companion animal greyhounds. Some states and councils still require greyhounds to wear a muzzle in public, while NSW, Victoria and the ACT have removed the requirement. Greyhounds are one of the most gentle breeds and highly suitable for adoption if properly socialised.

Criticism
In 2013, ABC News revealed that some greyhounds were given to veterinary surgeons as blood donors and then euthanised. In 2015, the Australian Veterinary Association stated that all greyhounds bred for racing should be registered with an independent authority in order to track their life time movements. In 2016, 179 trainers were charged with illegal exports to Macau, China, a practice that was banned in 2013. This led to Qantas announcing they would no longer transport ex-racers.

Popular culture
In Australian slang, the term Dapto dog is rhyming slang for wog, a pejorative for a person of Mediterranean background, active in greyhound racing in Dapto in the 1950s as represented on stage by the Griffin Theatre Company with the 2015 production of Dapto Chaser. Dapto was also once home to Australia's largest greyhound pup auctions in Australia.

Notable Australian owners of racing greyhounds include Tony Lockett, Tim Cahill, and Ricky Ponting.

In Australian English, the term "plumpton" (named for the village in Sussex) has been used for an enclosed racecourse for greyhounds.

References

External links
 
 Greyhound Racing New South Wales